Roland Dagher is a Lebanese sprinter. He competed in the men's 100 metres at the 1980 Summer Olympics.

References

Year of birth missing (living people)
Living people
Athletes (track and field) at the 1980 Summer Olympics
Lebanese male sprinters
Olympic athletes of Lebanon
Place of birth missing (living people)